Felix Greene (21 May 1909 – 15 June 1985) was a British journalist who chronicled several communist countries in the 1960s and 1970s.

He was one of the first Western reporters to visit North Vietnam when he travelled there for the San Francisco Chronicle in the 1960s. He first visited China for the BBC in 1957.

Greene later produced documentary films, including One Man's China, Tibet, Cuba va!, Vietnam! Vietnam! and Inside North Viet Nam. Right-wing critics have accused these films of presenting a one-sided view of communist society. The Wall Street Journal argued that Greene purposely hid negative information about the extent of starvation in China and called him a "fellow traveller."

Commander R. W. Herrick of the U.S. Navy reviewed A Curtain of Ignorance in Naval War College Review, writing, "There can be no question but that [Greene] set out deliberately to 'prove' his contentions that practically everything having to do with Communist China and its policies is good, while Chiang Kai-shek and the Nationalist regimes are unmitigatedly bad. ... Yet, once the reader understands and allows for this bias, this book is eminently worth reading." Herrick agreed with Greene's observation that "... on matters where great national feelings are aroused, scholars and experts are just as likely as the rest of us to allow their judgments to be swayed by the prevailing climate of opinion." He found the chapters on Nationalist China and the China Lobby to be provocative reading.

In the 1970s, Greene went to Dharamsala to visit the 14th Dalai Lama, who recalled that after three days of discussion, Greene's attitude had changed.

Greene lived in the San Francisco area for 20 years and died in Mexico of cancer. He was a cousin of the author Graham Greene.

Books

 Awakened China: The Country Americans Don't Know. Garden City, New York, 1961.
 The Enemy: What Every American Should Know About Imperialism. New York: Vintage Books, 1971.
 VIETNAM! VIETNAM! In Photographs and text. 1966, Palo Alto, California: Fulton Publishing Company, LCCN: 66-28359
 A Curtain of Ignorance, London: Jonathan Cape, 1965.  Details of how Communist China was reported in the US in the 1960s.
 The Wall Has Two Sides. A Portrait Of China Today, The Reprint Society, 1963.

Greene's films and photos are distributed by Contemporary Films.

Notes

1909 births
1985 deaths
English male journalists
San Francisco Chronicle people
Place of birth missing
Deaths from cancer in Mexico